Jalan Kuching–Serian is a major highway in the Kuching, Samarahan and Serian Divisions in Sarawak, Malaysia. This highway is part of the Pan Borneo Highway (AH150), part municipal council road and part state road.

The Kilometre Zero for all roads in Sarawak is the Charles Brooke Memorial in Kuching. Jalan Kuching–Serian begins from the 3rd Mile Interchange and ends at the Serian Roundabout.

Features
The major section of Jalan Kuching–Serian is the dual carriageway, which begins at the 15th Mile Intersection and ends at the Serian Roundabout.

The part of Pan Borneo Highway project, Serian will have two interchanges, Serian Interchange 1 at the Serian Roundabout and Serian Interchange 2 at the St Teresa's Church, which can eases the traffic from Kuching and Sri Aman. It was carried by Lebuhraya Borneo Utara (LBU) Sdn Bhd as a turnkey contractor and Zecon Kimlun JV Consortium Sdn Bhd, the main contractor.

List of interchanges 

Malaysian Federal Roads
Highways in Malaysia